Beyond is a Canadian paranormal documentary television series created by Steven Rumbelow and produced by Renegade Motion Pictures. The show premiered on Space and ran from 2005 to 2007. Robin Poitras was the hostess in seasons one and two, and Alannah Myles took on the role for seasons three and four. Episodes have been available on Hulu, Amazon Video, YouTube on Demand, and various other digital platforms.

The show uses interviews with eyewitness, well-respected academics, such as physicists, and paranormal practitioners, such as shamans to investigate orbs, ghosts, EVP, alternative healing, and other paranormal subjects.  It was developed as a follow-up to Steven Rumbelow's 90-minute documentary called Ghosts which also aired on Space.

Every season of Beyond has a main theme and the last episode of each season is a conclusions episode where they summarize the season and have a round table discussion, which includes the experts and practitioners from the season.

Episodes

Season I (2005)

Season II (2005)

Season III (2006)

Season IV (2007)

Home media
DVDs of each season were available for a time to purchase through the television show's official website.

See also
 Haunting

References

External links
 
 
 Beyond's Youtube Channel
 ''Beyond'''s Facebook Page
 Renegade Motion Pictures (production company)

CTV Sci-Fi Channel original programming
2000s Canadian documentary television series
Paranormal television